Elettra Miura Lamborghini (born 17 May 1994) is an Italian television personality, singer, social media influencer, and socialite. A granddaughter of Ferruccio Lamborghini, the founder of Lamborghini, she began her career in reality television at age 22, and ventured into music in early 2018 with her debut single "Pem Pem". Subsequent to the release of her debut studio album Twerking Queen in the summer of 2019, she served as a judge for the sixth season of The Voice of Italy in 2019.

Career 
She gained notoriety for appearing in a number of international reality shows such as Gran Hermano VIP and the MTV shows Super Shore and Geordie Shore.

Her debut single "Pem Pem" was released in February 2018 and reached number six on the Italian charts. She released her first album Twerking Queen on 14 June 2019. In the same year she appeared as a music coach and judge on the sixth edition of The Voice of Italy.

Lamborghini participated at the Sanremo Music Festival 2020 with the song "Musica (e il resto scompare)", placing 21st out of 23. On 14 February 2020, she released a deluxe version of the album Twerking Queen titled Twerking Queen (el resto es nada).

Personal life 
Elettra is the granddaughter of Ferruccio Lamborghini, founder of the sports car manufacturer Lamborghini.
She is the sister of motorcycle racer Ferruccio Lamborghini and is the heiress of the Lamborghini fortune.

In 2019, Lamborghini and Dutch DJ Afrojack made their engagement public. They got married on 26 September 2020 in Lake Como, Italy. She considers herself bisexual.

Television

Discography

Studio albums

Extended plays

Singles

References

External links 

 Elettra Lamborghini on IMDB
 Elettra Lamborghini on allmusic
 Elettra Lamborghini on discogs

Living people
1994 births
Mass media people from Bologna
Italian women singers
Italian female models
Italian television personalities
Musicians from Bologna
Italian LGBT singers
Bisexual musicians